This is a historical list of ministers who have served in the Punjab government. For a list of current ministers see Mann ministry and Departments of Government of Punjab, India.

List of the Departments arranged in alphabetical order.

References

Government of Punjab, India
Mann
 
2022 in Indian politics
Mann ministry